Taiba N'Diaye Wind Power Station, (PETN), is a  wind power plant in Senegal. The power station is the largest wind power station in West Africa, by generation capacity.

Location
The wind farm occupies , in a semi-arid region of the country.

Overview
The wind farm consists of 46 Vestas V126 turbines, each with rated capacity of 3.45MW.

Development
The power station is owned and operated by Lekela, a British renewable energy development company, focusing on Africa. The power generated is sold to Senegal National Electricity Company (Senelec), for integration in the national electricity grid. Senelec will purchase the power for 20 years from plant commissioning, according to the power purchase agreement (PPA) for the Taiba N’Diaye wind power project, signed in 2013. Upon completion, the 158.7 megawatts generated, increased Senegal's generation capacity by 15 percent.

At the substation, the electricity is stepped-up to 225kV. There is no need for a high voltage transmission line. The Tobene substation acts as the project substation as well as the grid connection point.

The estimated 400GWh generated annually at this power station supplies an estimated 2 million customers and mitigates an estimated 300,000 tonnes of carbon dioxide emissions annually.

Construction
In 2018, Vestas, a Danish wind turbine manufacturer, installer and servicer, was awarded the engineering, procurement, and construction (EPC) contract for the 46 turbines of this power station. The contract included supply, transportation and installation of the wind turbines. In addition, it included operations and maintenance for 20 years. The contract for the environmental and social impact assessment (ESIA) of the Taiba N’Diaye wind power project, was awarded to Ramboll.

Construction, which was ongoing as of January 2020, is in three phases:
 Phase One This involves the installation of 16 wind turbines, with generation capacity of 55.2 megawatts. This phase was completed in December 2019. This phase was commissioned in February 2020.
 Phase Two This involves the installation of another 16 wind turbines, with generation capacity of 55.2 megawatts. This phase is ongoing and is expected to conclude in the 3rd quarter of 2020.
 Phase Three This involves the installation of the final 14 wind turbines, with generation capacity of 48.3 megawatts. This phase is expected to begin after the second phase and conclude in the 4th quarter of 2020.

The fully completed wind farm with generation capacity of 158.7 megawatts, reached commercial commissioning in December 2021.

Costs and funding
The Overseas Private Investment Corporation (OPIC), of the United States, committed $250 million in financing and $70 million in reinsurance for the wind power project, as early as September 2016. In August 2018, the Danish Export Credit Agency (EKF) also guaranteed an export loan facility for the project, worth €140 million (US$161 million). Political risk insurance was provided by the Multilateral Investment Guarantee Agency (MIGA). Power Africa of the United States Agency for International Development (USAID), also contributed to the development of this project.

Energy storage
In May 2021, Lekela selected the Danish firm DNV, to carry out the feasibility studies for a 40 megawatt storage facility, on-site at its Taiba N'Diaye Wind Farm. The storage system is intended to "store 175 MWh of electricity, enough to stabilize the national grid of Senelec, the Senegalese national electricity company".

Expansion
In December 2021, Afrik21.africa reported that Lekela had received a grant from the U.S. International Development Finance Corporation (DFC), to carry out feasibility studies, with a view to add another 100 megawatts to the existing wind farm. The feasibility studies will inform the size of the expansion, which will include additional battery energy storage.

See also
List of power stations in Senegal

References

External links
  Senegal: First phase of Taiba N’Diaye wind farm online As of 19 December 2019.

Wind farms in Senegal
Energy infrastructure in Senegal
2021 establishments in Senegal
Buildings and structures in Senegal
Energy infrastructure completed in 2021